Argyria is a skin condition due to exposure to silver.

Argyria may also refer to:
Argyria (moth), a genus of moth
Argyria (Pontus), a town of ancient Pontus, now in Turkey
Argyria (Troad), a town of the ancient Troad, now in Turkey